"The Debarted" is the thirteenth episode of the nineteenth season of the American animated television series The Simpsons. It first aired on the Fox network in the United States on March 2, 2008, and features Topher Grace as guest star and a cameo by radio host Terry Gross. A new troublesome student named Donny arrives at Springfield Elementary School, prompting a gleeful Bart to befriend him as his partner in pranks. Meanwhile, Marge wrecks the family car, and Homer gets a new luxury vehicle as a loaner car, which he grows attached to. The episode is a parody of the 2006 film The Departed.

Plot
Marge is driving Bart and Lisa to school, when the children begin fighting. Tired and exhausted from moderating the kids, Marge inadvertently crashes into Hans Moleman's car. Bart manages to escape unhurt and attends class. He is shocked to find that his seat has been taken by a new student, named Donny, who was recently kicked out of his former school. Donny soon gets Milhouse and Nelson to awe him. After Donny throws massive amounts of garbage at the school wall, Bart begins to feel he is losing popularity. While trying to imitate Donny, Bart ends up humiliating himself. Feeling his social rank amongst his peers slipping, Bart plays a prank on Principal Skinner, employing magnets and metal sole pads in Skinner's shoes. While on the school stage, the magnets cause Skinner to dance uncontrollably and ultimately be hurled outside of the school into a container filled with old and lost mouth retainers. Bart regains the respect and admiration of his peers, but when Skinner attempts to find who is responsible, Donny takes the blame for Bart's prank. Skinner takes Donny to his office, whereupon Donny is revealed to be in fact a snitch hired by Skinner and Superintendent Chalmers to get Bart suspended.

Bart invites Donny into his clique alongside Nelson and Milhouse, and they plot school pranks. To signify Donny's entrance in the group, Bart rewards him with illegal Blue Vine licorice sticks from Europe, which turn the eater's tongue blue. At the school, Bart is perplexed when Skinner repeatedly anticipates and foils his pranks. Groundskeeper Willie informs Bart that a snitch is amongst them, but Bart wrongly suspects Milhouse. With the aid of Nelson and Donny, Bart imprisons Milhouse in a locker. Bart plans a final prank on Skinner involving egging his house with an ostrich egg. While helping Skinner hang up a banner, Bart notices that Skinner's tongue is blue. Bart figures out that the snitch is Donny, who had given Skinner the Blue Vines. Bart and Nelson ambush Donny and announce that they are going to force him to ingest enormous quantities of Diet Coke and Mentos. They are interrupted by the arrival of Chalmers, Skinner, and Willie, who has snitched on Bart in turn. Donny ultimately saves Bart, as he was the only person who ever cared for him. The two boys escape as Skinner, Chalmers, and Willie are caught in the Diet Coke/Mentos explosion. Before hitting the road, Donny tells Bart that he will always remember their friendship and promises to meet up with him again in the future.

Meanwhile, Homer has taken his car to get it fixed. Raphael informs him of a loaner car he could use in the meantime. The loaner car is significantly better than Homer's old car, and he embraces it, and begins driving it everywhere and takes Marge out on a romantic drive. Raphael calls Homer, informing him that his old car is ready to be picked up. Homer, however, refuses to give up his luxury car. Lisa finds herself enjoying Homer's loaner car as well, taking advantage of a feature that lets her contribute directly to NPR and receive a message of appreciation by radio-show host Terry Gross. While driving past the car dealer, Homer sees Raphael selling his car for $99. Homer is furious and realizes that his car is like his child, and takes it back, abandoning the loaner car.

Cultural references
 The title and plot of the episode reference the 2006 film The Departed and the episode contains several elements of the film, including the use of the Dropkick Murphys song "I'm Shipping Up to Boston".

Reception
The episode had an estimated 7.86 million viewers and received a 9 percent audience share.

Richard Keller of TV Squad enjoyed the episode and liked the fact that it focused on Bart. "I enjoyed this episode more than the usual ones that have aired during this post-Simpsons Movie season. There were plenty of good moments and a few of them that I actually laughed at."

Robert Canning of IGN said, "This was a fun and funny episode." He thought Homer's loaner car scenes were "just silly enough to make an impact." Canning thought both Topher Grace and Terry Gross did great jobs with their parts. He gave the episode a 7.8 out of 10.

Joel H. Cohen was nominated for Writers Guild of America Award in the animation category for writing the episode.  He was also nominated for an Annie Award nomination for Best Writing in an Animated Television Production.

References

External links

 

The Simpsons (season 19) episodes
2008 American television episodes